Splitwind Island is an island  long, lying off the north end of Booth Island, in the Wilhelm Archipelago. Charted by the French Antarctic Expedition, 1903–05, and named by Charcot for Alphonse de Rothschild. To avoid confusion with Rothschild Island near Alexander Island, the United Kingdom Antarctic Place-Names Committee (UK-APC) in 1959 recommended that the name be changed to Splitwind Island. Owing to some physical peculiarity, the wind south of this island is often very different from that north of it.

See also 
 List of Antarctic and sub-Antarctic islands

Islands of the Wilhelm Archipelago